This is a list of Canadian television related events from 1991.

Events

Debuts

Ending this year

Television shows

1950s
Country Canada (1954–2007)
Hockey Night in Canada (1952–present)
The National (1954–present).
Front Page Challenge (1957–1995)

1960s
CTV National News (1961–present)
Land and Sea (1964–present)
Man Alive (1967–2000)
Mr. Dressup (1967–1996)
The Nature of Things (1960–present, scientific documentary series)
Question Period (1967–present, news program)
The Tommy Hunter Show (1965–1992)
W-FIVE (1966–present, newsmagazine program)

1970s
Canada AM (1972–present, news program)
the fifth estate (1975–present, newsmagazine program)
Marketplace (1972–present, newsmagazine program)
100 Huntley Street (1977–present, religious program)

1980s
Adrienne Clarkson Presents (1988–1999)
CityLine (1987–present, news program)
CODCO (1987–1993)
Fashion File (1989–2009)
Fred Penner's Place (1985–1997)
Good Rockin' Tonite (1989–1992)
Katts and Dog (1988–1993)
The Kids in the Hall (1989–1994)
The Journal (1982–1992)
Just For Laughs (1988–present)
Midday (1985–2000)
On the Road Again (1987–2007)
The Raccoons (1985–1992)
Road to Avonlea (1989–1996)
Street Legal (1987–1994)
Under the Umbrella Tree (1986–1993)
Venture (1985–2007)
Video Hits (1984–1993)

1990s
 Are You Afraid of the Dark? (1990–1996)
 E.N.G. (1990–1994)
 Material World (1990–1993)
 Neon Rider (1990–1995)

TV movies

Television stations

Debuts

Closures

See also
 1991 in Canada
 List of Canadian films of 1991